Frank Murphy (born January 12, 1878) was a Michigan politician.

Early life
Murphy was born in Wyandotte, Michigan on January 12, 1878. Murphy was of Irish descent. His father, Frank Murphy, was a judge in this area and worked in the insurance business.

Career
Murphy also worked in the insurance business. He also worked with other businesses at different times, including the Detroit Times, a telephone company, and a gas company. On November 3, 1937, Murphy was elected as a Democratic member of the Michigan House of Representatives from the Wayne County 1st district. He served in this position until 1940.

References

1878 births
American people of Irish descent
People from Wyandotte, Michigan
Democratic Party members of the Michigan House of Representatives
20th-century American politicians
Year of death missing